illi is the eleventh studio album by Taiwanese Mandopop artist Will Pan. It was released on 11 August 2017, by Warner Music Taiwan, his first release with the label.

The album's lead single, "Coming Home", was released on 13 July 2017.

Track listing

Music videos

References

External links
 Warner Music Taiwan - 潘瑋柏 / illi 異類 【榮耀重生版】 
 Will Pan official website

2017 albums
Will Pan albums
Warner Music Taiwan albums